Cats' Play is a 1972 Hungarian drama film directed by Károly Makk. It was nominated for the Academy Award for Best Foreign Language Film and was entered into the 1974 Cannes Film Festival. It is based on the novel by István Örkény.

Cast
Margit Dajka as  Orbánné, Erzsi (as Dayka Margit)
Ildikó Piros as  Orbánné at young age
Elma Bulla as  Giza
Éva Dombrádi as  Giza at young age
Mari Törőcsik as  Maid
Margit Makay as  Paula
Samu Balázs as  Csermlényi Viktor 
Gyöngyi Bürös as  Ilus, Orbánné's daughter 
Attila Tyll as  Józsi, Ilus's husband
Sári Kürthy as  Viktor's mother
Tibor Szilágyi as  Iskolaigazgató (School director)
Erzsi Orsolya as Házmesterné (janitor's wife)

See also
 List of submissions to the 47th Academy Awards for Best Foreign Language Film
 List of Hungarian submissions for the Academy Award for Best Foreign Language Film

References

External links

1972 films
1970s Hungarian-language films
Films directed by Károly Makk
1972 drama films
Hungarian drama films
Films about sisters